Owenetta is an extinct genus of owenettid procolophonian parareptile. Fossils have been found from the Beaufort Group in the Karoo Basin of South Africa. Although most procolophonians lived during the Triassic, Owenetta existed during the Wuchiapingian and Changhsingian stages of the Late Permian as well as the early Induan stage of the Early Triassic. It is the type genus of the family Owenettidae, and can be distinguished from other related taxa in that the posterior portion of the supratemporal bears a lateral notch and that the pineal foramen is surrounded by a depressed parietal surface on the skull table.

Species
The type species of Owenetta is O. rubidgei. It is known from  several skulls, but no postcranial skeleton. It was described in 1939 from a partial skull found from the Late Permian Cistecephalus Assemblage Zone of the Beaufort Group. Several other localities, all from the overlying Dicynodon Assemblage Zone, have yielded the remainder of the known specimens.

The naming of a new species in 2002, O. kitchingorum, extended the temporal range of Owenetta into the Early Triassic, meaning that the genus had survived past the Permian–Triassic extinction event. This new species was considered distinct from the type species based on features found from three nearly complete specimens that were present from the Lystrosaurus Assemblage Zone. Found in 1968, the first material of O. kitchingorum was a small block containing two skeletons in close proximity to one another (although at the time they were thought to be of the type species). These skeletons provided much of the information used to distinguish O. kitchingorum from the type species. O. kitchingorum differed from O. rubidgei in that it possessed small postparietals on the posterior edge of the skull table and that the maxilla held no more than 20 teeth, some of which were caniniform. The best preserved specimen seems to be a subadult individual on the basis of features of the skull table.

A year after the new species of Owenetta was named, a paper proposed that it should be assigned to its own distinct genus, although a new name is yet to be provided. A more recent paper also supported this polyphyly. If this is the case, Owenetta is once again temporally restricted to the late Permian, and most likely died out at the end of the period as a result of the mass extinction event.

Later that year Colubrifer, named in 1982 from a specimen (UCMP 42773) found from the Early Triassic Lystrosaurus Assemblage Zone and though to represent a short limbed lizard, was re-described. Based on a skull nearly identical to those known of Owenetta, it appears that the animal was a procolophonian almost certainly of that genus. It was found to be a junior synonym of Owenetta, but due to the poor preservation of its holotype, was reassigned Owenetta sp.

Phylogenetics
When Owenetta was first named and described, it and other procolophonians were thought to be within Cotylosauria, a group that comprised what was believed to be the most primitive of reptiles. Cotylosauria has since been renamed Captorhinida, which is now thought to be a paraphyletic group anapsids and anapsid relatives. Owenetta and other procolophonians are now known to be within the subclass Parareptilia. It has later been placed within the family Nyctiphruretidae, but is currently placed within the family Owenettidae, of which it is the type genus.

The well preserved, nearly complete specimens of Owenetta can be helpful in phylogenetic analyses of procolophonians and the parareptiles, which have recently undergone many great revisions. Although the postcranial skeleton is only known from immature individuals, comparisons can be made with related taxa such as Barasaurus, which is known from both immature and mature specimens, that resolve this morphology issue. Owenetta has been used in some phylogenetic analyses to uphold the traditional theory that the procolophonians were the ancestors of turtles, although it now seems that turtles, if not Archosauromorpha, have evolved from parieasaurids or even sauropterygians.

References

External links
Owenetta in the Paleobiology Database

Procolophonomorphs
Permian reptiles of Africa
Early Triassic reptiles of Africa
Lopingian first appearances
Early Triassic extinctions
Prehistoric reptile genera